Patrick Burke (1779 – 16 September 1843) was an Irish Roman Catholic clergyman who served as the Bishop of Elphin from 1827 to 1843.

Career 
Born in 1779 in Lisnageeragh (Lisnageera), he matriculated in St. Patrick's College, Maynooth in 1799, ordained a deacon in 1802 and a priest in 1803. He served in his native diocese, and in 1810 served as parish priest of Ballinakill and Kilcronan and in 1812 qwas appointed parish priest of Glinsk. In 1819, in Maynooth College he was ordained as Coadjutor Bishop of Elphin. He was also appointed Titular Bishop of Augustopolis in Phrygia.

Burke was elected Bishop of Elphin on 8 May 1827. As bishop, he resided in Seaville House, Co. Sligo, part of the Vernon estate, following his death his house became the Ursuline Convent.

Dr. Burke is buried in the family vault in Kilcroan Cemetery, Ballymoe, Co. Galway.

References

Roman Catholic bishops of Elphin
1779 births
1843 deaths
Alumni of St Patrick's College, Maynooth